The 1997 Virginia Attorney General election was held on November 4, 1997, to elect the next attorney general of Virginia. The Republican nominee, Mark Earley, defeated the Democratic nominee, William Dolan, by around 15 percent.

General election

Candidates
Mark Earley (R)
William Dolan (D)

Results

References

Attorney General
1997
Virginia